Justine Henin was the defending champion, but retired from the sport on May 14, 2008.

Venus Williams won in the final 7–6(7–1), 6–2, against Flavia Pennetta.

Seeds
The top four seeds receive a bye into the second round.

Draw

Finals

Top half

Bottom half

External links
 WTA tournament draws

Women's Singles
Zurich Open